How Not to Behave was an Australian comedy series on ABC, hosted by Gretel Killeen and Matt Okine. The 15–part series was based on a Swedish format which examines etiquette and manners. It premiered on 15 July 2015.

Episodes

References

2015 Australian television series debuts
2015 Australian television series endings
Australian comedy television series
Australian Broadcasting Corporation original programming
Television series by Screentime